Karamoko Kader Dembélé (born 22 February 2003)  is an English professional footballer who plays as a winger for  club Brest. Born in Lambeth, London, Dembélé has been called up to represent both Scotland and England at youth level.

Dembélé attracted media attention in October 2016 when he made his debut for Celtic's under-20 development team at the age of 13. After having played eight matches and scored one goal for Celtic at a professional level, he signed for French club Brest in July 2022.

Early life
Dembélé was born in 2003 in Lambeth, South London to parents from Ivory Coast. His family moved north to Scotland, to Govan in Glasgow, before his first birthday. Dembélé, or "Kaddy" as he is known, attended St Constantine's Primary School in Drumoyne. He started at St Ninian's High School in Kirkintilloch (the affiliated school for Celtic's academy players) in 2015.

Club career

Celtic
Dembélé started playing football for Park Villa Boys Club at the age of five and was recognised as a prodigy from a young age. He joined Celtic aged 10 in 2013. In July 2016, Dembélé was named as player of the tournament when representing Celtic U13 at the St Kevin's Boys Academy Cup. Soon after his appointment as Celtic head coach, Brendan Rodgers invited Dembélé to participate in a light technical training session with the first team squad.

On 3 October 2016, Dembélé gained widespread media attention after making his debut for Celtic's under-20 side aged 13 playing with and against players who were up to seven age groups above him. He was named on the bench because several regular starters were away playing for Scotland's under-19 team and was brought in during the 81st minute, replacing the youngest first-team player in Celtic's history, the 16-year-old Jack Aitchison. A match report on the official Celtic website stated that "the diminutive playmaker didn't look out of place and played his part in the closing stages." The response to Dembélé's U20 debut included concern about the physical and mental impact of such a young player being fast-tracked through the developmental ranks. On 2 June 2017, Dembélé signed a youth registration contract to stay at Celtic.

On 24 December 2018, Dembélé signed his first professional contract at 15-years-old with Celtic, set to keep him at the club until 2021. In April 2019, he featured for Celtic's academy team in the seasonal finals of both the Scottish Youth Cup and the Glasgow Cup, losing out 3–2 to Rangers in the first and beating the same opposition by the same scoreline in the second.

Dembélé made his senior debut on 19 May 2019 in a 2–1 victory against Hearts, coming on as a second-half substitute. After the match, Dembélé collected his winners' medal and helped to lift the Scottish Premiership trophy as Celtic ended the season 9 points clear at the top of the league. His performance was praised by manager Neil Lennon. Six days later, he was named in the squad for the 2019 Scottish Cup Final, also against Hearts. This time he did not leave the bench, but collected a winner's medal following Celtic's 2–1 victory. In October 2019, L'Équipe named Dembélé as one of six "outstanding young players set to revolutionise the game", a list that also included Barcelona's Ansu Fati. On 12 December 2019, Dembélé became the youngest ever footballer to play for a Scottish team in European competition when he came on a substitute in Celtic's 2–0 loss away against Romanian side CFR Cluj.

Dembélé rarely featured for the first team after that, but he did come on as a substitute against St Johnstone on 12 May 2021, and scored his first senior goal in a 4–0 win for Celtic, latching onto a pass from David Turnbull and scoring from a tight angle. He sustained a fractured ankle during a pre-season friendly against Bristol City in July 2021, and eventually had to undergo an operation in October 2021. He made his return to action on 13 February 2022, playing in Celtic B's 4–0 win over Vale of Leithen in a Lowland Football League fixture. After being an unused substitute in three first-team games, as well as scoring for the B side in a Glasgow Cup tie against Queens Park, Dembélé finally returned to first team action on 2 March 2022 when he came on as a substitute for Jota near the end of Celtic's 2–0 win over St Mirren.

Brest
Having left Celtic after nine years following the expiration of his contract, in July 2022 Dembélé joined French club Brest on a free transfer, signing a four-year contract with the Ligue 1 side.

International career
Dembélé is eligible to represent Scotland, England or the Ivory Coast internationally. On 19 October 2016, he was called up to the Scotland national under-16 football team for the 2016 Victory Shield. He made his debut for the Scotland under-16s on 1 November, coming on as a second-half substitute during a 2–2 draw against Wales. Coach Brian McLaughlin commented, "He was excellent. He looked confident and it's a very good group to come into." Dembélé made a further appearance a few days later in a 3–0 defeat, as a 63rd minute substitute against the Republic of Ireland.

However, prior to participating in the Victory Shield, Dembélé travelled south in October 2016 to train with England under-15s at St George's Park. On 18 November 2016, Dembélé confirmed his intention to join up with the England under-15s ahead of a match against Turkey that December. On 17 December 2016, Dembélé came off the bench against Turkey to make his England debut and assisted a goal in a 5–2 victory. On 16 February 2017, Dembélé made his first start for England under-15 in a match against Belgium.

Nevertheless, he also continued to represent Scotland, playing an integral part in the Scotland under-16 squads for two UEFA development tournaments in 2017, both of which Scotland won. Most notably, Dembélé featured in a Scotland victory over England in July 2017. On 19 August 2018 he made his debut for Scotland under-17's in a 1–0 away win against Russia, coming on as a 50th minute substitution for Connor Barron, and went on to start two days later against Russia.

On 10 October 2019, Dembélé made his debut for England under-17 during a 3–3 draw with Germany at the Pinatar Arena in Spain. Dembélé scored his first goal for this age group during a 1–1 draw with Spain on 14 October 2019. During the same month, it was reported that Dembélé had committed to representing England internationally, and Dembélé has only represented England since.

On 29 March 2021, Dembélé made his debut for England U18s during a 2–0 win away to Wales at the Leckwith Stadium.

Personal life
Dembélé's older brother, Siriki Dembélé, plays as a winger for AFC Bournemouth. He is likewise eligible to represent England, Scotland or the Ivory Coast internationally. Another brother, Hassan, was playing for Celtic's academy in November 2017.

Career statistics

Honours
Celtic
 Scottish Premiership: 2021–22
 Scottish Cup: 2018–19
 Glasgow Cup: 2018–19

See also
List of sportspeople who competed for more than one nation

References

External links
 
 
 

2003 births
Living people
People educated at St Ninian's High School, Kirkintilloch
Sportspeople of Ivorian descent
English people of Ivorian descent
Scottish people of Ivorian descent
Black British sportspeople
People from Govan
Footballers from Lambeth
Footballers from Glasgow
English footballers
Scottish footballers
Association football forwards
Scotland youth international footballers
England youth international footballers
Scottish Professional Football League players
Celtic F.C. players
Stade Brestois 29 players
Lowland Football League players
English expatriate footballers
Expatriate footballers in France